Szélatya or Szélkirály (Turkish: Yel Ata or Yel Kralı, Old Turkic: Çel Ede or Çel Ata, "Wind Father") is the Hungarian god or deity of wind. 

His female counterpart is Szélanya.

Names in various languages

Azerbaijani: Yel ata / Yel baba
Uzbek: Yel Ota
Tatar: Җил Әти or Җил Ата or Cil Ana 
Kazakh: Жел Ата 
Chuvash: Ҫил Атте or Ҫил Ашшӗ 
Bashkort: Εл Атай 
Sakha: Тыал Аҕа 
Turkmen: Ýel Ata 
Ottoman: يل آتا 
Kyrgyz: Жел Ата 
Khakas: Чил Аба or Чил Ада 
Altay: Салкын Ада 
Tuvan: Салгын Ата
Balkar: Джел Ата 
Mongolian: Салхи Эцэг
Buryat: Һалхин Эсэгэ 
Oirat: Салькн эцк 

All of them mean "wind father".

The Onoghurs (Huns) also worshipped him.

Description
Szelatya has long hair, silver weapons, and thunder horses. He is said to appear as a youthful and handsome man in hungarian mythology, but as an elderly man in turkic mythology.

He has a jungle or sylvan named Silver Forest.

Family
His father is Arany Atyacska (Golden Father) and his mother's name is Hajnal Anyacska (Dawn Mother). However, some accounts mention that he is the son of Kayra, the primordial god.

See also
 Hungarian mythology
 Yel iyesi
 Szelanya

References

Bibliography
 Mitológiai enciklopédia I. Főszerk. Szergej Alekszandrovics Tokarjev. A magyar kiadást szerk. Hoppál Mihály. Budapest: Gondolat. 1988.  
 Türk Mitolojisi Ansiklopedik Sözlük, Celal Beydili, Yurt Yayınevi (page 608)

External links 
 Türk Mitoloji Sözlüğü, Pınar Karaca (Yel Baba)
 Szegeney Csizmadia Szelkiraly

Hungarian mythology
Turkic deities
Wind deities